The 1968 Campeonato Profesional was the 20th season of Colombia's top-flight football league. 14 teams competed against one another. Unión Magdalena won their first league title.

Teams

Torneo Apertura

Torneo Finalización

Source: RSSSF.com Colombia 1968

Third Place

|}

Final

|}

References

External links 
Dimayor official website

1968 in Colombian football
Colombia
Categoría Primera A seasons